The manga series Kashimashi: Girl Meets Girl was written by Satoru Akahori and illustrated by Yukimaru Katsura. Its original character designs were designed  by Sukune Inugami and the school uniforms by Cospa. The story focuses on Hazumu Osaragi, a normal, albeit effeminate, high-school boy who is killed when an alien spaceship crash-lands on him and is revived as a girl. As Hazumu adjusts to her new life, she enters a same-sex love triangle with her two best female friends.

Chapters were serialized in the monthly manga magazine Dengeki Daioh between the July 2004 and May 2007 issues. The thirty-five main chapters plus five "special" chapters and one "bonus track" chapter were collected in five bound volumes by MediaWorks under their Dengeki Comics imprint; each volume contains seven main chapters and at least one bonus chapter. The first volume was published on January 27, 2005 and the last volume on May 26, 2007.

Kashimashi was adapted as a 12-episode anime television series plus a single original video animation (OVA) episode by Studio Hibari. The series aired in Japan on TV Tokyo from January 11 to March 29, 2006, and the OVA was released on October 27, 2006. The Kashimashi manga was licensed for an English-language release in North America by Seven Seas Entertainment. Starting on December 25, 2006, volumes were released every three to four months until the fifth was published on March 18, 2008. Seven Seas re-released the manga in a two-volume omnibus collection of about 500 pages each; volume one was published in June 2009, and volume two in December 2009. The series is licensed in French by Ki-oon and in Chinese in Taiwan by Kadokawa Media.

Volume list

See also

List of Kashimashi: Girl Meets Girl characters
List of Kashimashi: Girl Meets Girl episodes

References

External links
Kashimashi: Girl Meets Girl manga at Seven Seas Entertainment

Chapters
Kashimashi